The Yale Bulldogs men's basketball team represents Yale University in New Haven, Connecticut, competing in the Ivy League. The team plays home games in the John J. Lee Amphitheater of the Payne Whitney Gymnasium. The team has reached the NCAA Division I men's basketball tournament six times, in 1949, 1957, 1962, 2016, 2019, and 2022. Yale’s best finish in the NCAA tournament came in 1949 when they advanced to the Elite Eight. The current head coach is James Jones.

History
Yale has been named national champion on six occasions – in 1896, 1897, 1899, and 1900 by the Premo-Porretta Power Poll, which began retroactive selections with the 1895–96 season; and in 1901 and 1903 by the Helms Athletic Foundation, which began retroactive selections with the 1900–01 season.
Penn and Yale played in the First College Basketball game with 5 men on a team in 1897.

Yale has won seven Ivy League championships – 1957, 1962, 1963, 2002, 2016, 2019 and 2020. It also won the Eastern Intercollegiate Basketball League, the forerunner to the Ivy League, eight times – 1902, 1903, 1907, 1915, 1917, 1923, 1933 and 1949. The Bulldogs captured the first official Ivy League title in 1957 as they finished 12–2 and lost to eventual national champion North Carolina, 90–74, in the NCAA East Regional. The 1962 club finished 13–1 in Ivy play, but lost in overtime to Wake Forest, 92–82, in the East Regional. The 1963 team tied Princeton for the Ivy title with an 11–3 record, but fell to the Tigers in a playoff, 65–53. In 2002, the Bulldogs were part of the first three-way tie in Ivy history. Yale beat Princeton 76–60 in the first Ivy playoff game, but fell to Penn 77–58 in the game to determine the NCAA berth. In 2015, Yale tied Harvard for the Ivy title with an 11–3 record, with a playoff between the two to determine the NCAA automatic bid. Harvard won that playoff game at the Palestra in Philadelphia on March 14, 2015 by a score of 53–51, thus preventing Yale from reaching the NCAA tournament in which the Bulldogs had not appeared in 53 years. The Bulldogs won the Ivy League championship outright in 2016 with a 13–1 conference record to advance to the NCAA Tournament for the first time in 54 years. The team has appeared in five NCAA Tournaments overall (in 1949, 1957, 1962, 2016 and 2019). On March 17, 2016, Yale defeated the Baylor Bears 79–75 in the first round of the NCAA Tournament for the school's first Tournament victory. In 2019 Yale beat Harvard, 97-85 to win its first Ivy League Men's Basketball Tournament. Yale won its second Ivy League Men's Basketball Tournament in 2022 when on March 12 the #2 seed Yale outlasted the #3 seed University of Pennsylvania, with a score of 66-64.

Postseason history

NCAA tournament results
Yale has appeared in the NCAA tournament six times. The Bulldogs' combined record is 1–7.

NIT results
Yale has been to the National Invitation Tournament (NIT) twice. Their record is 1–2.

CIT results
Yale has been to the CollegeInsider.com Tournament (CIT) twice. Their combined record is 4–2.

References

External links
 

 
Basketball teams established in 1896
1896 establishments in Connecticut